Mirra Aleksandrovna Andreeva (born 29 April 2007) is a Russian tennis player.

Andreeva has a career high WTA singles ranking of 299 achieved December 2022.

Andreeva made her WTA Tour main-draw debut at the 2022 Jasmin Open, after receiving a wildcard for the singles tournament.

Personal life
Her sister Erika Andreeva is also a tennis player. They are both from Krasnoyarsk, but moved to Moscow for coaching.

ITF finals

Singles: 5 (4 titles, 1 runner-up)

References

External links
 
 

2007 births
Living people
Russian female tennis players
21st-century Russian women
People from Krasnoyarsk